Mohd Afif bin Amiruddin (born 22 March 1984) is a Malaysian footballer who plays as a defender for Pahang in the Malaysia Super League.

Club career
Afif has also played for Kedah FA (where he has played Malaysia Super League and AFC Cup matches) and Kelantan.

He made his debut for the Malaysia national football team in a friendly against Indonesia on 14 September 2014.

International appearances

Career statistics

Club

International

Honours

Club
PDRM
 Malaysia Premier League: 2014

International
Malaysia
 AFF Suzuki Cup: Runner-up 2014

References

External links 
 Profile at PDRM FA official website
 Profile at ifball.com
 Afif Amiruddin bukti diri aset berharga PDRM (Video at astroawani.com)

1984 births
Living people
Malaysian footballers
Malaysia international footballers
Kelantan FA players
Kedah Darul Aman F.C. players
PDRM FA players
Sime Darby F.C. players
People from Kota Bharu
People from Kelantan
Malaysia Super League players
Association football defenders
Malaysian people of Malay descent